Tore Kallstad (born 1 August 1965) is a Norwegian former professional footballer.

He was born in Lørenskog, and has several matches played for youth national teams of Norway. He played in the Norwegian Premier League in 1986 and 1988 for Strømmen IF, and in 1992 and 1993 for Lillestrøm SK, amassing 57 matches and 14 goals.

References

1965 births
Living people
People from Lørenskog
Norwegian footballers
Association football forwards
Strømmen IF players
Lillestrøm SK players
Eliteserien players
Sportspeople from Viken (county)